The Lorraines Branch is a canal in central France, some 50 km east of Bourges.  It is a disused branch of the Canal latéral à la Loire now serving as a feeder from the Allier River.  At one time it carried traffic from the Allier via a circular lock. The Ecluse de Lorraines was 32 km in diameter with three gates providing access from the river on two levels above and below a weir.

See also
 List of canals in France

References

External links
 Grehan - Afloat in France information See PK 109 for Photo and description of the Ecluse de Lorraines

Canals in France